Bauern Freund Print Shop is a historic print shop located at Marlborough Township, Montgomery County, Pennsylvania. It was built in 1838, and is a 2 1/2-story, brick building with a gable roof. It has a front porch with a hipped roof. The building was built by Enos Benner, a German-American publisher of Der Bauern Freund (The Farmer's Friend) and other influential German language publications.

It was added to the National Register of Historic Places in 1982.

References

Industrial buildings and structures on the National Register of Historic Places in Pennsylvania
Industrial buildings completed in 1838
Buildings and structures in Montgomery County, Pennsylvania
National Register of Historic Places in Montgomery County, Pennsylvania